Republica station or República station could refer to the following:

 República, São Paulo Metro, Brazil
 República, Santiago Metro, Chile
 Republica, Bucharest Metro, Romania